Mount Kuring-gai railway station is on the Main Northern line, serving the Sydney suburb of Mount Kuring-gai. It is served by Sydney Trains T1 North Shore Line services and some early morning and late night NSW TrainLink Central Coast & Newcastle Line services.

History
Mount Kuring-gai station opened on 5 October 1901 as a passing loop named Kuring-gai. It was renamed Mount Kuring-gai on 1 August 1904, and in 1909 the present station was built when the Main Northern line was duplicated.

The station was the terminating point for some services and had a signal box to facilitate these workings. It was removed in April 1988.

Platforms and services

Transport links
Transdev NSW operate two routes via Mount Kuring-gai station:
592: Hornsby station to Mooney Mooney
597: Hornsby station to Berowra Heights

References

External links

Mount Kuring-gai station details Transport for New South Wales

Railway stations in Sydney
Railway stations in Australia opened in 1909
Short-platform railway stations in New South Wales, 6 cars
Hornsby Shire
Main North railway line, New South Wales